The Santuario de Nuestra Señora de Guadalupe is a historic Catholic shrine in Santa Fe, New Mexico. It is the oldest church in the United States dedicated to Our Lady of Guadalupe and is listed on the New Mexico State Register of Cultural Properties. It is also a contributing property in the Santa Fe Historic District.

The church is a simple cruciform building with thick adobe walls and has been remodeled several times, most recently in the 1970s.

History
The church was built sometime between the late 1700s and early 1800s, though its exact date of construction is unknown. The records of the Archdiocese of Santa Fe suggest it was built around 1795, as a license authorizing its construction was issued that year. However, the church's existence was not definitively documented until 1821. Conversely, at least one source claimed the church is much older, dating to before the Pueblo Revolt of 1680, though this is probably apocryphal. The famous altar screen depicting Our Lady of Guadalupe, transported in pieces from Mexico City over the Camino Real, is signed by José de Alcíbar and dated 1783.

The church remained active until the 1830s, but by the time the U.S. Army occupied the city in 1846, it was little-used and in disrepair. A visitor in 1881, John Gregory Bourke, wrote

At the time of Bourke's description, the church was only being used once a year for the festival of Our Lady of Guadalupe on December 12. However, after the Denver and Rio Grande Railroad arrived in Santa Fe in 1880, Archbishop Jean-Baptiste Lamy arranged to have it repaired to serve the new English-speaking population brought by the railroad. A native of France, Lamy preferred European architectural styles over the local adobe vernacular and had the church remodeled with a pitched roof and steeple starting in 1881.

On June 27, 1922, the steeple and roof were destroyed by a fire that also damaged the interior, though the altar screen survived. The church was then rebuilt in the Mission Revival style with curved parapets and a tiled roof. It was remodeled again in 1976–78 to bring it closer to the original appearance, though some of the Mission details remain in place. Since the opening of a new church next door in 1961, it is no longer an active parish church but is still used for monthly masses.

References

External links

Roman Catholic churches in Santa Fe, New Mexico
New Mexico State Register of Cultural Properties
Our Lady of Guadalupe